Alifatou Djibril (born 13 February 1980) is a Togolese athlete specializing in the shot put and discus throw. She won multiple medals at the continental level.

Competition record

Personal bests
Shot put – 15.74 (Adelaide 2005) NR
Discus throw – 56.16 (Sydney 2004) NR
Hammer throw – 33.08 (Adelaide 2003)

References

1980 births
Living people
Togolese shot putters
Togolese discus throwers
Togolese female athletes
African Games bronze medalists for Togo
African Games medalists in athletics (track and field)
Athletes (track and field) at the 2003 All-Africa Games
Athletes (track and field) at the 2011 All-Africa Games
21st-century Togolese people